Christopher Kenneth Kimsey (born 3 December 1951 in Battersea, London, England) is an English record producer, mixer and musician most famous for having co-produced The Rolling Stones' Undercover and Steel Wheels albums. He was also an engineer on their 1971 album Sticky Fingers as well as 1978's Some Girls and 1980's Emotional Rescue and assisted Mick Jagger and Keith Richards closely in preparing 1981's Tattoo You. He was the engineer and associate producer for both Emotional Rescue and Tattoo You.

He has also worked with Peter Frampton, Marillion, The Cult, Peter Tosh, The Psychedelic Furs, Emerson, Lake & Palmer Ten Years After, Johnny Hallyday, Louis Bertignac, Diesel Park West, JoBoxers, Killing Joke, New Model Army, Ash, The Chieftains, Soul Asylum, Duran Duran, Yes, Anderson Bruford Wakeman Howe, INXS, Anti Nowhere League, Moral Code X, The Proclaimers and Golden Earring.

He was the recording engineer and mixing engineer for Frampton Comes Alive! in 1976.

For Bill Wyman's self-titled third album from 1982, Kimsey served as co-producer (with Wyman) and engineer. He also mastered the album with Ted Jensen, mixed it, sang backing vocals and co-wrote the song "Jump Up" with Wyman.

In the 1980s Kimsey was responsible for the commercial success of Killing Joke with more poppier albums such as Night Time (album) and Brighter Than a Thousand Suns (album).

Kimsey is credited as having contributed backing vocals to Incommunicado from Marillion's 1987 album Clutching at Straws.

Chris Kimsey is credited for mixing the performances of Elton John, Paul McCartney and Cliff Richard & The Shadows on the Knebworth double album in 1990.

Kimsey was also a judge for the 7th annual Independent Music Awards to support independent artists' careers.

In 2014 Chris Kimsey returned to Olympic Studios, where he began his career.  He is serving as the sound consultant and engineer for its live concert series and recording facilities.

Selection of his work as a producer 

Served as producer, co-producer or associate producer on the following records (in chronological order):
Bill Wyman - (1974) Monkey Grip
Peter Frampton - (1975) Frampton
Jerry Wiliams - (1975) Gone
F.B.I. - (1976) F.B.I.
Strapps - (1976) Secret Damage
Peter Frampton - (1977) I'm in You
The Rolling Stones - (1978) Some Girls
Carillo - (1978) Rings Around the Moon
Peter Frampton - (1979) Where I Should Be
Terry Reid - (1979) Rogue Waves
The Rolling Stones - (1980) Emotional Rescue
The Rolling Stones - (1981) Tattoo You
Doc Holiday - (1981) Doc Holiday
The Dice - (1982) The Dice
Bill Wyman - (1982) Bill Wyman
Jimmy Cliff - (1982) Special
The Rolling Stones - (1983) Undercover 
Peter Tosh - (1983) Mama Africa
Joan Jett & the Blackhearts (1984) Glorious Results of a Misspent Youth
The Cult - (1984) Dreamtime
Weird Science - (1985) soundtrack
Suzie and the Banshees - (1985) The Sweetest Chili
Killing Joke - (1985) Night Time
Marillion - (1985) Misplaced Childhood
Marillion - (1986) Brief Encounter
Killing Joke - (1986) Brighter Than a Thousand Suns
Cactus World News (1986) Urban Beaches
Marillion - (1987) Clutching at Straws
The Psychedelic Furs - (1987) Midnight to Midnight
Peter Tosh - (1988) The Toughest (Capitol)
Marillion - (1988) B'Sides Themselves
The Escape Club - (1988) Wild Wild West
The Psychedelic Furs - (1988) All of This and Nothing
Noiseworks - (1988) Touch
Hurrah! - (1988) The Beautiful
The Rolling Stones - (1989) Steel Wheels 
Diesel Park West - (1989) Shakespeare Alabama
Peter Frampton (1989) Classics, Vol.12
Anderson Bruford Wakeman Howe - (1989) Quartet (I’m Alive)
Anderson Bruford Wakeman Howe - (1989) Order of the Universe
Anderson Bruford Wakeman Howe - (1989) Brother of Mine (#1)
Anderson Bruford Wakeman Howe - (1989) Brother of Mine (#2)
Anderson Bruford Wakeman Howe - (1989) Anderson Bruford Wakeman Howe
Duran Duran - (1990) Liberty
The Rolling Stones - (1991) Flashpoint
Maryen Cairns - (1991) Pictures Within album
The Cult - (1991) Ressurection Joe
Fish - (1991) Internal Exile
Killing Joke - (1992) Laugh? I Nearly Bought One!
Marillion - (1992) Six of One, Half Dozen of the Other
Quireboys - (1992) Bitter Sweet and Twisted
Peter Frampton - (1992) Shine On: A Collection
The Rolling Stones - (1993) Jump Back: The Best of the Rolling Stones 1971-1993
The Cult - (1993) Pure Cult: for Rockers, Ravers, Lovers, and Sinners
Duran Duran - (1993) Ordinary World
Colin James - (1993) Colin James and the Little Big Band
INXS - (1993) Full Moon Dirty Hearts
Curt Smith - (1993) Soul on Board
Wendy James - (1993) Now Ain't the Time for Your Tears
Kinky Machine - (1993) Kinky Machine
The Psychedelic Furs - (1994) B-Sides and Lost Grooves
London Symphony Orchestra - (1994) Symphonic Music of the Rolling Stones
Johnny Hallyday - (1994) Rough Town
Eat - (1994) Epicure
Fish - (1995) Yin
Colin James - (1995) Bad Habits
The Chieftains - (1995) The Long Black Veil
Peter Tosh - (1996) The Best of Peter Tosh: Dread Don’t Die
JoBoxers - (1996) Essential Boxerbeat
Gipsy Kings - (1996) Compas
The Cult - (1996) High Octane Cult
Johnny Hallyday - (1996) Destination Vegas
Kingpin - (1996) soundtrack
Billy Squier - (1996) Reach for the Sky: The Anthology
Peter Frampton - (1996) Greatest Hits
Marillion - (1997) Real to Reel/Brief Encounter
Marillion - (1997) The Best of Both Worlds
Jimmy Cliff - (1997) Super Hits
The Psychedelic Furs - (1997) Should God Forget: A Retrospective
Peter Frampton - (1998) The Very Best of Peter Frampton
Soul Asylum - (1998) Close
Soul Asylum - (1998) Candy From a Stranger
Fish - (1998) Kettle of Fish
Soul Asylum - (1998) I Will Still Be Laughing
Duran Duran - (1998) Greatest
Duran Duran - (1999) Strange Behaviour
Billionaire - (1999) Ascension album
Deacon Blue - (2000) Our Town: The Greatest Hits
The Cult - (2000) Rare Cult
The Cult - (2000) Pure Cult: The Singles 1984-1995
Ash - (2000) Wild Surf, Pt. 1
Peter Frampton (2001) Anthology: The History of Peter Frampton
The Psychedelic Furs - (2001) Greatest Hits
The Proclaimers - (2001) Persevere
The Rolling Stones - (2002) Forty Licks
The Law - (2002) The Law
Yes - (2002) In a Word: Yes (1969–)
David Knopfler - (2002) Wishbones
Ash - (2002) Intergalactic Sonic 7"s
The Proclaimers - (2002) The Best of The Proclaimers
Jimmy Cliff - (2002) We All Are One: The Best of Jimmy Cliff
Jimmy Cliff - (2003) Sunshine in the Music
Peter Frampton - (2003) 20th Century Masters – The Millennium Collection: The Best of Peter Frampton
Marillion - (2003) The Best of Marillion
Marillion - (2003) The Singles Boxset, Vol. 2
Tom Jones - (2003) The Definitive Tom Jones 1964–2002 Box Set
The Bandits - (2003) And They Walked Away
Killing Joke - (2004) For Beginners
Duran Duran - (2004) Singles Box Set 1986–1995
David Knopfler - (2004) Ship of Dreams
Peter Frampton - (2005) Gold
Tony Moore - (2005) Perfect and Beautiful
New Model Army - (2007) High
Reemer - (2007) Snakes and Ladders
Kiki Dee - (2009) The Best of Kiki Dee album
Peter Frampton - (2008) Wind of Change/Frampton’s Camel
Peter Tosh - (2008) The Best of Peter Tosh (VCT)
Soul Asylum - (2008) Super Hits
New Model Army - (2008) Today Is a Good Day
Marillion - (2009) The Singles '82-'88
Peter Frampton - (2010) Thank You Mr. Churchill
MP4 - (2010) Cross Party album
Very Emergency - (2010) The Getaway album
Saint Jude - (2010) Diary of a Soul Fiend album
Peter Frampton - (2011) Icon
The Rolling Stones - (2011) Singles 1971–2006 
The Rolling Stones - (2011) GRRR!
Ash - (2011) The Best of Ash
New Model Army - (2011) Anthology
Colin James - (2011) Take it From the Top: The Best of Colin James
The Proclaimers - (2012) The Very Best of 25 Years 1987–2012
Peter Tosh - (2012) 1978–1987
Deacon Blue - (2012) The Rest
Thirsty - (2014) Thirsty
Short Stack - (2015) Homecoming
Maryen Cairns - (2016) Femina Australis
Peter Perret - (2017) How The West Was Won
Maryen Cairns - (2019) Come To Me
S.O.L Collective - (2019) Reveries
Everett Watson - (2021) Politico
GHK - (2021) Songs On The Hoof
Everett Watson - (2021) Equator
Kristi Kimsey - (2021) As I Look Back
Maryen Cairns - (2022) Anew

Selection of his work as a mix engineer 
Served as the mix engineer, or assistant-engineer on the following records (in chronological order):
Led Zeppelin - (1970) Led Zeppelin III
The Rolling Stones - (1971) Sticky Fingers
Ten Years After - (1970) Watt
B.B. Blunder - (1971) Workers' Playtime
Ten Years After - (1971) A Space in Time
B.B. King - (1971) In London
Ten Years After - (1972) Rock & Roll Music to the World
Howl the Good - (1972) Howl the Good
Bobby Keys - (1972) Bobby Keys
Peter Frampton - (1972) Wind of Change
Peter Frampton - (1973) Frampton's Camel
Stray Dog - (1973) Stray Dog
Ten Years After - (1973) Recorded Live
Spooky Tooth - (1973) You Broke My Heart So I Busted Your Jaw
Emerson Lake & Palmer - (1973) Brain Salad Surgery
Bill Wyman - (1974) Monkey Grip
Johnny Hallyday - (1974) Je T’Aime Je T’Aime Je T’Aime
Peter Frampton - (1974) Somethin's Happening
Peter Frampton - (1974) Frampton
Peter Frampton - (1976) Frampton Comes Alive
F.B.I. - (1976) F.B.I.
Automatic Man - (1976) Automatic Man
Bad Company - (1977) Burnin' Sky
Peter Frampton - (1977) I'm in You
The Rolling Stones - (1978) Some Girls
Carillo - (1978) Rings Around the Moon
Terry Reid - (1979) Rogue Waves
The Rolling Stones - (1980) Emotional Rescue
The Rolling Stones - (1981) Tattoo You
Doc Holiday - (1981) Doc Holiday
Bill Wyman - (1982) Bill Wyman
Peter Tosh - (1983) Mama Africa
The Rolling Stones - (1983) Undercover
The Colourfield - (1985) Virgins and Philistines
Marillion - (1985) Misplaced Childhood
Killing Joke - (1985) Night Time
Killing Joke - (1986) Brighter Than a Thousand Suns
The Psychedelic Furs - (1987) Midnight to Midnight
Anderson Bruford Wakeman Howe - (1989) Anderson Bruford Wakeman Howe
Diesel Park West - (1989) Shakespeare Alabama
The Rolling Stones - (1989) Steel Wheels
The Rolling Stones - (1991) Flashpoint
The Rolling Stones - (1991) Stones At The Max
Fish - (1991) Internal Exile
Peter Frampton - (1992) Shine On: A Collection
Killing Joke - (1992) Laugh? I Nearly Bought One!
Colin James - (1993) Colin James and the Little Big Band
Johnny Hallyday - (1993) Parc des Princes 1993
Curt Smith - (1993) Soul on Board
Wendy James - (1993) Now Ain't the Time for Your Tears
INXS - (1993) Full Moon Dirty Hearts
London Symphony Orchestra (1994) Symphonic Music of the Rolling Stones
The Rolling Stones - (1995) Stripped
Fish - (1995) Yin
The Chieftains - (1995) The Long Black Veil
Colin James - (1995) Bad Habits
Johnny Hallyday - (1995) Lorada
Johnny Hallyday - (1996) Destination Vegas
Peter Tosh - (1996) The Best of Peter Tosh: Dread Don’t Die
Kingpin - (1996) soundtrack
Gipsy Kings - (1996) Compas
Greg Lake - (1997) From the Beginning: Retrospective album
Johnny Hallyday - (1997) Anthologie, Vol. 2
Johnny Hallyday - (1998) Anthologie, 1970–75
Mott the Hoople - (1998) All the Young Dudes: Box Set
Gary Wright - (1998) Best of Gary Wright: The Dream Weaver
Bad Company - (1999) The 'Original' Bad Co. Anthology
Billionaire - (1999) Ascension album
Deacon Blue - (2000) Our Town: The Greatest Hits
INXS - (2001) Shine Like It Does: The Anthology (1979–1997)
INXS - (2001) The Years 1979-1997
The Proclaimers - (2001) Persevere
The Proclaimers - (2002) The Best of The Proclaimers
Ten Years After - (2002) The Anthology 1967–1971
The Chieftains - (2002) The Wide World Over
Yes - (2002) In a Word: Yes (1969–)
David Knopfler - (2002) Wishbones
Tom Jones - (2003) The Definitive Tom Jones 1964–2002 Box Set
The Bandits - (2003) And They Walked Away
David Knopfler - (2004) Ship of Dreams
Peter Frampton - (2005) Gold
Tony Moore - (2005) Perfect and Beautiful
The Chieftains - (2005) Live from Dublin: A Tribute to Derek Bell
Gary Wright - (2005) Extraction/Footprint
Canterbury Glass - (2007) Sacred Scenes and Characters
New Model Army - (2007) High
The Psychedelic Furs - (2008) Psychedelic Furs/Talk Talk Talk/Forever Now/Mirror Moves/Midnight to Midnight
Peter Frampton - (2008) Wind of Change/Frampton’s Camel
Chris Jagger - (2009) The Ridge album
The Rolling Stones - (2009) The Rolling Stones Box Set
Peter Frampton - (2010) Thank You Mr. Churchill
Ten Years After - (2010) Think About the Times: The Chrysalis Years 1969–1972
Very Emergency - (2010) The Getaway
Saint Jude - (2010) Diary of a Soul Fiend
The Rolling Stones - (2011) Singles 1971–2006
The Rolling Stones - (2011) GRRR!
New Model Army - (2011) Anthology
Colin James - (2011) Take it From the Top: The Best of Colin James
Deacon Blue - (2012) The Rest
The Proclaimers - (2012) The Very Best of 25 Years 1987–2012
Thirsty - (2014) Thirsty
Short Stack - (2015) Dance With Me EP
Boris Grebenshchikov - (2022) House of all Saints
Sweet Loretta (2022) Talking To Yourself (again)
Boris Grebenshchikov - (2023) The Bardic Songs

References

Bibliography
Further reading:
 

English record producers
Killing Joke members
Living people
1951 births
People from Battersea
English audio engineers